Imperial War Museum is a tram stop in Trafford Park on Greater Manchester's Metrolink light rail system. It opened on 22 March 2020.

Locale
The stop is located on Trafford Wharf Road and serves the Imperial War Museum North, ITV Studios and MediaCityUK.

Services
From this stop a service runs generally every 12 minutes towards Cornbrook and towards the Trafford Centre.

References

 Metrolink future network

Railway stations in Great Britain opened in 2020
Tram stops in Trafford
Salford Quays